Afgar, or the Andalusian Leisure is a musical with lyrics by Douglas Furber, music by Charles Cuvillier and a book by Fred Thompson and Worton David.  It is based on Cuvillier's 1909 French operetta of the same name, with words by André Barde and Michel Carré.  

The original West End production opened at the London Pavilion on 17 September 1919 and ran for 300 performances.  It featured Marie Burke, Alice Delysia, Strafford Moss, John Humphries, Lupino Lane, Harry Welchman and Leon Morton, and its cast recording was the first original cast recording of a musical at the Pavilion.  The Broadway production, directed by Frank Collins, opened on 8 November 1920 at the Central Theatre and ran for 168 performances.  It starred Irving Beebee as Don Juan, Jr. and Delysia as Zaydee.

Synopsis

Don Juan, Jr. has been imprisoned within sight of a Moorish harem to punish him for being too flirtatious.  The favorite harem girl, Zaydee, who likes Don, organizes a strike of the harem girls, demanding his release and one husband for each girl.  The strike succeeds, and all ends happily.

Song list
Act I
Give the Devil His Due - Don Juan, Jr. 
Rose of Seville - Isilda 
Live for Love - Zaydee 
Man from Mexico - Coucourli 
Caresses - Zaydee
Why Don't You? (Lyrics By Joseph McCarthy, music By Harry Tierney) - Zaydee 

Act II
United We Stand - Coucourli, Houssain and Chorus 
We're the Gentlemen of the Harem - Coucourli, Lord Afgar, Don Juan, Jr. and Chorus 
Sunshine Valley - Isilda 
Where Art Thou, Romeo? (Lyrics By Joseph McCarthy; music By Harry Tierney) - Zaydee 
Garden of Make Believe - Zaydee 
I Hate the Lovely Women (Lyrics By Joseph McCarthy; music By Harry Tierney) - Coucourli 
Ceremony of Veils - Zaydee, Isilda, Houssain and Chorus 
'Neath Thy Casement - Don Juan, Jr.

References

External links
Internet Broadway Database listing
Afgar production listing at broadwayworld.com
List of 1919 London shows
Cuvillier works at musicaltheatreguide.com

1919 musicals
Broadway musicals
West End musicals
Compositions by Charles Cuvillier